Reid McNeill (born April 29, 1992) is a Canadian professional ice hockey defenceman who is currently playing with Löwen Frankfurt in the Deutsche Eishockey Liga (DEL). He has formerly played in the American Hockey League (AHL).

Playing career
McNeill played major junior hockey in the Ontario Hockey League with the London Knights and the Barrie Colts. He was selected in the sixth-round, 170th overall, in the 2010 NHL Entry Draft by the Pittsburgh Penguins. On May 16, 2012, McNeill signed a three-year entry-level contract with the Penguins.

In the midst of the 2016–17 season, and in his fifth season within the Wilkes-Barre/Scranton Penguins organization, McNeill was traded by Pittsburgh to the St. Louis Blues, in exchange for Danny Kristo on November 19, 2016. He played out the remainder of the campaign with the Blues AHL affiliate, the Chicago Wolves, appearing in 47 games for 8 points.

As a free agent at the conclusion of his contract with the Blues, McNeill agreed to continue in the AHL, signing a one-year deal with the Syracuse Crunch on July 20, 2017. In the 2017–18 season, McNeill made 59 appearances and posted 9 assists from the blueline. He added two goals for the Checkers in the playoffs through 7 games.

In the 2018–19 season, McNeill ventured his first professional abroad, playing in the Austrian Hockey League (EBEL) with the Dornbirn Bulldogs. In his lone year in Austria, McNeill added a steady influence on the blueline, contributing with 11 points in 46 games.

On October 3, 2019, McNeill marked his return to North America, joining the defending Champion Charlotte Checkers roster on a try-out to begin the 2019–20 season. McNeill was released before making his debut with the Checkers and returned to original AHL club, the Wilkes-Barre/Scranton Penguins on a PTO. He made one appearance with the Penguins before he was released from his tryout on October 29, 2019. Opting to leave abroad, McNeill signed a one-year contract with Danish club, Herning Blue Fox of the Metal Ligaen on November 13, 2019.

Career statistics

References

External links
 

1992 births
Living people
Barrie Colts players
Canadian ice hockey defencemen
Chicago Wolves players
Dornbirn Bulldogs players
Fischtown Pinguins players
Herning Blue Fox players
Ice hockey people from Ontario
London Knights players
Löwen Frankfurt players
Pittsburgh Penguins draft picks
Sportspeople from London, Ontario
Syracuse Crunch players
Wheeling Nailers players
Wilkes-Barre/Scranton Penguins players